Maiwand Teaching Hospital is a hospital in Kabul built in the 1960s.  

When first built it was called Qale-e-Baqer Khan Hospital, later the name was changed to Mastorat.  It was given its present name during the Democratic Republic of Afghanistan.  It is closely linked with Kabul Medical University. It was set up to treat around 300-400 patients a day, but the daily patient load now often surpasses 1,000.

It has departments of otorhinolaryngology, dermatology, pediatrics, Plastic Surgery and Pediatric Surgery.

See also 
List of hospitals in Afghanistan

References

Hospitals in Kabul
Hospitals in Afghanistan
Teaching hospitals